Kelly Plateau is an ice-covered plateau, about  long and from  wide, on the east side of the Churchill Mountains, Antarctica, between the lower parts of Jorda Glacier and Flynn Glacier. It was named by the Advisory Committee on Antarctic Names for Commander George R. Kelly, U.S. Navy, commanding officer of U.S. Navy Squadron VX-6 during Operation Deep Freeze 1964.

References

Plateaus of Oates Land
Transantarctic Mountains